The Star Awards for Best Info-Ed Programme Host was an award presented annually at the Star Awards, a ceremony that was established in 1994.

The category was introduced in 2009, at the 15th Star Awards ceremony; Belinda Lee received the award for her performance in Come Dance with Me and it is given in honour of a Mediacorp host who has delivered an outstanding performance in an info-ed programme. The nominees were determined by a team of judges employed by Mediacorp; winners are selected by a majority vote from the entire judging panel.

Since its inception, the award was given to six hosts. Quan Yi Fong is the most recent and final winner in this category for her performance in Where to Stay. Belinda Lee is the only host to win in this category twice. Guo Liang and Bryan Wong were nominated on five occasions, more than any other host. Guo also holds the record for the most nominations without a win.

The award was discontinued from 2016 as all performances in the hosting category (variety, info-ed) were shifted to the newly formed Best Programme Host category.

Recipients

 Each year is linked to the article about the Star Awards held that year.

Category facts

Most wins

Most nominations

References

External links 

Star Awards